Phacopsis oroarcticae is a species of lichenicolous (lichen-dwelling) fungus in the family Parmeliaceae. It was formally described as a new species in 2010 by Russian mycologist Mikhail P. Zhurbenko. The type specimen was collected from a stony polar desert in the Severnaya Zemlya Archipelago in Central Siberia, where it was found growing on the lobes of the foliose lichen Brodoa oroarctica; the species epithet refers to its host. Infection by the fungus results in bleached, swollen, and sometimes contorted lobes. It is the first Phacopsis species known to have Brodoa as a host.

References

Parmeliaceae
Fungi described in 2010
Fungi of Russia
Lichenicolous fungi
Taxa named by Mikhail Petrovich Zhurbenko